McBurney is a Scottish surname. Notable people with the surname include:

Andrew McBurney (1817–1894), American politician
Charles McBurney (archaeologist) (1914–1979), American archaeologist
Charles McBurney (politician) (born 1957), American politician
Charles McBurney (surgeon) (1845–1913), American surgeon
Gerard McBurney (born 1954), English composer and radio presenter
Jim McBurney (1933–2019), Canadian ice hockey player
John F. McBurney III (born 1950), American politician
Judy McBurney (1948–2018), Australian actress
Mona McBurney (1862–1932), British pianist and composer
Simon McBurney (born 1957), English actor
Stephen McBurney (born 1967), Australian rules football umpire
Waldo McBurney (1902–2009), American beekeeper and autobiographer
William B. McBurney (died 1892), Irish poet